Natale Masera (born June 1, 1910 in Busto Arsizio) was an Italian professional football player.

1910 births
Year of death missing
People from Busto Arsizio
Italian footballers
Serie A players
Aurora Pro Patria 1919 players
Inter Milan players
S.S.C. Bari players
S.S.C. Napoli players
S.S.D. Varese Calcio players
Calcio Lecco 1912 players
S.S.D. Sanremese Calcio players
Association football midfielders
Sportspeople from the Province of Varese
Footballers from Lombardy